Tyler's Ground (also known as Tyler's Meadow) was a cricket ground in Loughborough, Leicestershire. It is believed the ground was located along Allsop's Lane on the edge of the town, with the ground being described as located a short distance from Loughborough railway station. The first recorded match played at the ground was in 1856, when Loughborough played an All-England Eleven. A single first-class match was played at the ground in 1875, when the North played the South, with W. G. Grace taking nine wickets in the North's first-innings and William Mycroft taking six wickets in the South's first-innings. Grace then took five wickets in the North's second-innings, ending with match figures of 14/108, while Mycroft took eight wickets in the South's second-innings to finish with match figures of 14/38. No batsman passed 26 runs, with the highest innings score being 130 in the North's second-innings. The match ended in a victory by 125 runs for the North. No further matches are recorded as being played at the ground following this date and its location is today agricultural fields.

See also
List of cricket grounds in England and Wales

References

External links
Tyler's Ground at ESPNcricinfo
Tyler's Ground at CricketArchive

Defunct cricket grounds in England
Cricket grounds in Leicestershire
Sport in Loughborough
Defunct sports venues in Leicestershire
Sports venues completed in 1856
1856 establishments in England